99-es számú bérkocsi is a 1918 Hungarian crime drama film directed by Michael Curtiz. The film is sometimes just referred to as 99. 

The film's plot is about a London police officer who visits a millionaires club to make a wager that he could commit a crime that the police will not discover for 30 days.

Cast
Cast adapted from Michael Curtiz European Filmography.

Production
Outside working at the Star Company, Bela Lugosi worked for the smaller company Phönix. His second film for the company was 99-es számú bérkocsi Much of the cast had worked or would work with Lugosi, including Lajos Réthey who worked on stage with Lugosi in 1904 adaptation of Trilby and  Gyula Gál who worked with Lugosi at the National Theatre in Budapest. Mihály Várkonyi would work with Lugosi again in The Black Camel (1931).

The film was directed by Michael Curtiz. A reel of the film was overexposed during the films final production, leading to Curtiz ordering Lugosi to do retakes. Lugosi reportedly refused and was excoriated in front of the entire company and did not return until Curtis agreed to apologize to Lugosi in front of the crew.

Release
99-es számú bérkocsi was previewed at the Royal-Apolló in Budapest on September 12, 1918 before being released on November 8, 1918. 

Film historian István Nemeskürty stated that both 99-es számú bérkocsi and Az ezredes ranked among Curtiz's most successful Hungarian films.  The film was apparently popular enough that Phönix proposed a follow-up titled 77 featuring the same London police officer. That film does not appear to have gone into production.

References

Sources

External links

1918 films
1918 crime films
Films directed by Michael Curtiz
Austrian black-and-white films
Hungarian black-and-white films
Hungarian silent feature films
Austrian silent feature films
Hungarian crime films
Austrian crime films
Austro-Hungarian films